Simakov is a Russian masculine surname, its feminine counterpart is Simakova. It may refer to
Alexei Simakov (born 1979), Russian ice hockey forward
Anastasia Simakova (born 2004), Russian rhythmic gymnast
Angelina Simakova (born 2002), Russian artistic gymnast
Evgenya Simakov, Russian American physicist
Valeria Simakova (born 1990), Russian figure skater

Russian-language surnames